The 1917 Baylor Bears football team was an American football team that represented Baylor University as a member of the Southwest Conference (SWC) during the 1917 college football season. In its fourth season under head coach Charles Mosley, the team compiled a 6–2–1 record and outscored opponents by a total of 221 to 41.

Schedule

References

Baylor
Baylor Bears football seasons
Baylor Bears football